Eşmepınar can refer to:

 Eşmepınar, Çayırlı
 Eşmepınar, Çıldır